The Georgia Tech Yellow Jackets women's basketball team represents the Georgia Tech Yellow Jackets in NCAA Division I basketball. The team plays its home games at McCamish Pavilion.

Players

Notable players who have played with the Yellow Jackets include Niesha Butler, Kisha Ford, and Chioma Nnamaka.

Stadium

McCamish Pavilion (also nicknamed "The Thrillerdome") is an indoor arena located in Atlanta, Georgia. It is the home of the Georgia Tech basketball teams and hosted the Atlanta Hawks of the National Basketball Association from 1968 to 1972 and again from 1997 to 1999.  Tech's women's volleyball team has occasionally used the facility as well, primarily for NCAA tournament games and other matches that draw crowds that would overflow the O'Keefe Gymnasium.

During the 2011–12 basketball season, Alexander Memorial Coliseum was rebuilt as McCamish Pavilion. Except for the final home game, the Georgia Tech women's basketball team played its home games at The Arena at Gwinnett Center in suburban Duluth.

Year by year results

Conference tournament winners noted with # Source

|-style="background: #ffffdd;"
|colspan="8" align="center"|Atlantic Coast Conference

NCAA tournament results

References

External links